The men's singles squash event was part of the squash programme and took place between 23 August and 26 August, at the Gelora Bung Karno Hall D.

Schedule
All times are Western Indonesia Time (UTC+07:00)

Results

Finals

Top half

Section 1

Section 2

Bottom half

Section 3

Section 4

References 

Jakarta Palembang 2018
Draw and Results

Squash at the 2018 Asian Games